Mădălina Diana Ghenea (born 8 August 1987) is a Romanian actress and model. Ghenea started her career in modelling when she was 15 years old, and started presenting for Gattinoni in Milan, Italy.

Ghenea during her career has participated in fashion shows in Romania, Italy, Germany, Japan, Austria, Spain, France and South Africa; Ghenea during her career has appeared in several advertisements including Peroni, New Yorker and Quelle. After being selected for the international calendar along with two other models from the MRA agency, that are Catrinel Menghia and Carmen Prodan, Ghenea in 2007 appeared in a video for Eros Ramazzotti's album "The New Best of Eros Ramazzotti – Il tempo tra di noi". Ghenea in 2007 has attracted the Romanian media's attention with the release of Il tempo tra di noi videoclip, where she appeared as the girlfriend of the singer. In 2010, Ghenea appeared in the sixth edition of the Italian talent show Ballando con le Stelle, her partner becoming the dancer Simone Di Pasquale. Since 2011, Ghenea has been the image of TRE-Italy mobile company, and has appeared in many commercials with Raoul Bova; also in 2011 Ghenea became the image of the dance clothing DEHA and of the vintage racing cars Mille Miglia. She made in 2011 her debut as actress in the role of Irina in the Italian film I soliti idioti. Ghenea in 2013 appeared in Dom Hemingway alongside Jude Law. In 2015, Ghenea appeared as Miss Universe in Paolo Sorrentino's drama film Youth. With the Italian actor Gabriel Garko, Ghenea co-hosted and supported Carlo Conti for the 2016 edition of Sanremo Music Festival. She replaced Belén Rodríguez in September 2016 as the face of the luxury brand Vanitas.

Personal life
Ghenea is fluent in Romanian, Italian and English. She has joined the organisation "Artists for Peace and Justice" for Haiti relief. Ghenea donated money for the renovation of the Maternity section of the main hospital in her hometown Slatina.

Filmography

Cinema

Television
 2011 Ballando con le Stelle (series 7)
 2011 I soliti idioti
 2013 Borgia

Music Videos
 2007 Il tempo tra di noi – Eros Ramazzotti
 2012 Turn Up the Radio – Madonna
 2006 High School Musical – Gabriella Montez (Romanian voice)
 2007 High School Musical 2 – Gabriella Montez (Romanian voice)

References

External links

 

 https://redactia.ro/varsta-reala-a-madalinei-ghenea-de-ce-s-a-incheiat-relatia-actritei-cu-gerard-butler-223061

People from Slatina, Romania
1987 births
Living people
Romanian expatriates in Italy
Romanian film actresses
Romanian television actresses
Romanian female models
21st-century Romanian actresses
Actresses from Milan